Ramón García Martínez also known as Ramonzuelo (born 6 November 1905) was a Spanish footballer and football manager.

External links
BDFutbol profile

1905 births
Year of death missing
Footballers from Alicante
Spanish footballers
Association football midfielders
La Liga players
Segunda División players
Elche CF players
Levante UD footballers
CE Europa footballers
Hércules CF players
Spanish football managers
Alicante CF managers
Hércules CF managers
Catalonia international guest footballers